Graham Ash Black (14 May 1924 – 9 July 2007) was an Australian cricketer. He played six first-class matches for South Australia between 1949 and 1951.

See also
 List of South Australian representative cricketers

References

External links
 

1924 births
2007 deaths
Australian cricketers
South Australia cricketers
Cricketers from Adelaide